Rodrigo Grilli and Leonardo Kirche were the defending champions but Kirche decided not to participate.
Grilli played alongside André Miele. They reached the semifinals, where Ricardo Hocevar and Christian Lindell eliminated them.

Guido Andreozzi and Eduardo Schwank won this tournament, defeating Hocevar and Lindell 6–2, 6–4 in the final.

Seeds

Draw

Draw

References
 Main Draw

BH Tennis Open International Cup - Doubles
BH Tennis Open International Cup